"Cobbler" is the second episode of the second season of the AMC television series Better Call Saul, a spin-off series of Breaking Bad. The episode aired on February 22, 2016 on AMC in the United States. Outside of the United States, the episode premiered on streaming service Netflix in several countries.

Plot

Opening 
Howard Hamlin arrives to deliver groceries as Chuck McGill plays Gabriel Fauré's Sicilienne on his home piano. Chuck says he is apprehensive about Jimmy McGill joining Davis & Main, which Howard says happened mostly through Kim Wexler's efforts. After Howard leaves, Chuck turns on his metronome and stares at it silently.

Main story 
Before a meeting between Hamlin, Hamlin & McGill, and D&M, Kim rearranges name placards so that she and Jimmy sit side by side. On a break, she gives him a travel mug that originally read "World's Best Lawyer", which she altered to "World's 2nd Best Lawyer". At the nail salon Jimmy receives his new Mercedes-Benz company car, and is frustrated that his mug does not fit in the cup holder like it did in his old car.

At the courthouse, Mike Ehrmantraut sees Daniel Wormald arrive. He tells Mike about the burglary at his house and Mike cautions him about talking to the police, but Daniel is adamant about getting his baseball cards back. To prevent Daniel from meeting with the police, Mike offers to find the cards. Nacho Varga refuses to return them so Mike threatens to inform Tuco Salamanca about Nacho's secret drug deals. They agree that Daniel and Nacho will trade Daniel's Hummer for the baseball cards and $10,000.

Chuck sits in during an HHM–D&M  meeting. Jimmy is hesitant to discuss Sandpiper client outreach but continues after silent encouragement from Kim. Mike asks him to represent Daniel when Daniel meets with the police. Daniel tells detectives his baseball cards were returned so there is no need for further investigation, but they are skeptical. Jimmy talks to them privately and fabricates a story about a failed gay love affair and the stealing of the baseball cards as revenge. To provide an explanation for Daniel's hiding place, Jimmy claims it contained videos of Daniel sitting on various types of pies, a fictitious fetish called "Hoboken squat cobbler". The detectives believe him and end their investigation.

That night, Jimmy tells Kim about Daniel's case, including fabricating the videos. Kim is amused at first, but becomes appalled when she finds out that he fabricated evidence. Jimmy counters by asking why she was willing to play along with tricking Ken. She says that con had nothing to do with work. She asks why Jimmy was willing to falsify evidence, and he is unable to provide a satisfactory answer.

Production 
Bob Odenkirk was said to have inspired the name of the episode and the fetish portrayed in the police interrogation room scene. Peter Gould said "There weren't as many names. In fact, I don't know that we named it at all. I think (Jimmy) just said, 'He sits in pies.' He pitched the idea: 'Sex acts all have a name. Shouldn't there be a name for this thing?'"

"On this show, he mostly is a performer, but every once in a while, you see that he really is one of the great comic minds of our time. That was an example of Bob giving us a direction that we ran with, and then he ran with it in performance. And I just love it. I have to say, that was an interesting evolution of that scene. I'm really proud of it."

Reception

Ratings 
Upon airing, the episode received 2.23 million American viewers, and an 18-49 rating of 1.0.

Including DVR playback, the episode was watched by 4.373 million viewers and attained an 18-49 rating of 2.0.

Critical reception 
The episode received critical acclaim from critics, with much of the praise going to Bob Odenkirk's performance, Jimmy McGill's character development, and the police interrogation room scene. Terri Schwartz of IGN gave the episode an 8.8 rating, noting that the episode "made excellent use of Bob Odenkirk's humor, delivering some of the funniest moments of the series". The Telegraph noted how "amid the chuckles were intimations of darker days ahead".

Donna Bowman of The A.V. Club gave the episode an A- rating, comparing the police scene to the bar scene from the previous episode, saying It’s the criminal defense equivalent of the Viktor-with-a-K con from the premiere, a web of pure fabrication that plays right into the police’s jaded worldview: People are sick; anything’s possible; it’s almost too crazy not to be real. But to seal the deal, Jimmy buys some baked goods and films Daniel sitting on them. It’s not clear he needed to do this to convince the police. Rather, as he’s gleefully recounting the scam to Kim, it seems that he takes some pleasure in humiliating the idiotic dipshit. In doing so, though, he crosses a line—he fabricates evidence. Kim’s horrified, but for Jimmy, it’s a way of being both Slippin’ Jimmy and James M. McGill, Esq. He’s keeping it isolated from Davis & Main, he assures her; strictly pro bono work. He’s trying to have the cocobolo desk and flip the forbidden switch at the same time.

Nicholas Parco of The New York Daily News said of the police scene and the episode as a whole that "Sure, McGill [...] is nowhere near the Goodman that Breaking Bad fans fell in love with, but in the final scene of the aptly titled “Cobbler,” the evolution shines through more than ever. Alan Sepinwall of HitFix called the scene "the funniest Breaking Bad universe moment since Jesse thought Walt was going to build a robot, and the show sending a reassuring message that it will do just fine whenever the switch in Jimmy's office flips permanently to the Saul position." David Segal of The New York Times called the scene "my favorite scene of this very young season. I particularly loved the notion that as convincing as Jimmy was, the cops apparently ended the interview less than fully persuaded that a lover’s spat, and the aforementioned fetish, explained the home robbery of Daniel Wormald, the world’s most irritating naïf."

Jonathan Banks's role as Mike was received positively by critics as well. Sean T. Collins of The New York Observer said "Mike’s material is strong even by his own standards. His dynamic with Daniel Wormald [...] is exasperatingly entertaining enough to come with the Curb Your Enthusiasm soundtrack. [...] And it’s worth pointing out that in deciding to help reclaim the cards only after Dan reveals some of them belonged to his dad, we catch a glimpse of the tragic father-and-son backstory we learned about Mike in Season One’s strongest episode."

Notes

References

External links 
 "Cobbler" at AMC
 

Better Call Saul (season 2) episodes